Auschwitz: The Nazis and 'The Final Solution' is a BBC six-episode documentary film series presenting the story of Auschwitz concentration camp from its early operations in 1940 to the legal prosecution of Nazis involved in the operation of the camp. It combined interviews with former inmates and guards with authentic re-enactments of relevant events. It was first televised on BBC Two on 11 January 2005. In the United States, this series first aired on PBS television stations as Auschwitz: Inside the Nazi State in early 2005 and was released, under that title, in a 2-DVD box set (Region 1), by BBC Warner, on 29 March 2005.

Production
The series uses four principal elements: rarely seen contemporary colour and monochrome film from archives, interviews with survivors such as Dario Gabbai and former Nazis such as Oskar Gröning, computer-generated reconstructions of long-demolished buildings as well as detailed, historically accurate re-enactments of meetings and other events. These are linked by modern footage of locations in and around the site of the Auschwitz camp.

Laurence Rees stressed that the re-enactments were not dramatisations but exclusively based on documented sources:

There is no screenwriter… Every single word that is spoken is double – and in some cases triple – sourced from historical records.

This reflects the conception of the earlier BBC/HBO film Conspiracy, which similarly recreates the Wannsee Conference (an event briefly portrayed in programme 2 of this series) based on a copy of the minutes kept by one of the attendees, although that film also includes speculative dramatised sections.

The computer-generated reconstructions used architectural plans that only became available in the 1990s when the archives of the former Soviet Union became accessible to Western historians. The discovery of these plans is described in the 1994 BBC Horizon documentary Auschwitz: The Blueprints of Genocide.

Music featured
 Main Theme: Harpsichord Suite No. 4 in D minor, HWV 437, composed by Handel, for the DVD Menu & End Credits.
 Symphony No. 3, composed by Polish composer Henryk Górecki
 Fratres and Spiegel im Spiegel, both composed by Estonian composer Arvo Pärt 
 Piano Trio No. 2 (Schubert), composed by Schubert.
  The Twins (Prague) and Embers, both composed by Max Richter.
The last episode of the series also features Introitus from Mozart's Requiem in D minor, which is played just before the ending credits start to roll.

Episodes

Media information

DVD releases
Released on Region 2 DVD by BBC Video on 2005-02-14.
Also included in the BBC World War II DVD Collection.
Released on Region 1 DVD (2 DVD box set) by BBC Warner on 29 March 2005. (Dist. PBS Video.)

Companion books

On-Demand Broadcast 
Netflix: Auschwitz: The Nazis and the Final Solution Deadlink Saturday, 12 February 2022 @ ~Midnight UTC−05:00.

References

External links 
 

2005 British television series debuts
2005 British television series endings
2000s British documentary television series
Auschwitz concentration camp
Documentary films about the Holocaust
BBC History of World War II